Olof Bergqvist (24 September 1862 – 20 October 1940) was a Swedish bishop. He was the first bishop in the Diocese of Luleå, serving in that office from 1904 to 1937. He is remembered in Sweden for a Pentecost hymn, of which he was the author, which is still popularly sung in churches.

Church career
Bergqvist's family originated in the Värmland area, and he was ordained as a priest in Karlstad, the capital of Värmland, in 1892. In 1896 he became parish priest of the town of Gällivare in Lapland, then part of the Diocese of Härnösand. In 1904 the Diocese of Härnösand was divided, with the northern part (Lapland) becoming the new Diocese of Luleå, and Bergqvist was chosen as its first Bishop. He was consecrated as Bishop on 10 April 1904 by Martin Johansson, Bishop of Härnösand.

As Bishop of Luleå Bergqvist was responsible for the construction of new churches, and the development of an extended parochial and deanery system. He identified illiteracy as a significant issue amongst the laity of his See, and combated this by establishing a network of diocesan schools, together with training and study opportunities and networks for school teachers.

Political activity
Bergqvist was politically active, and served as an elected County Councillor for more than twenty-five years, representing the Swedish National Party.

Work with indigenous population
Bergqvist worked extensively with the indigenous Sami population of his diocese, and was a major contributor to the Church of Sweden's project to translate the New Testament scriptures into the Sami language. He was a fluent speaker of Swedish, Finnish, and Sami language.

References

1862 births
1940 deaths
Swedish Lutheran bishops
Knights of the Order of Charles XIII
Bishops of Luleå